Julia Drusilla (AD 38–79) was a princess of the Roman client kingdom of Mauretania in North Africa. She was the daughter of Ptolemy of Mauretania and thus a great-granddaughter of Cleopatra VII and Mark Antony. She was married to the procurator Marcus Antonius Felix in the reign of Roman emperor Claudius and later the Emesene priest-king Sohaemus.

Family
Drusilla's lineage is not entirely clear; Tacitus calls her a granddaughter of Cleopatra VII and Mark Antony, which would make her a daughter of King Juba II and Queen Cleopatra Selene II of Mauretania, but the chronology of her lifespan makes it more likely that she was their great-granddaughter. Drusilla was probably the daughter and only child born of Ptolemy and his wife, Julia Urania.

Her mother may have been a member of the Royal family of Emesa. She is mentioned in the funeral inscription of her freedwoman Julia Bodina at Caesaria as "Queen Julia Urania".

Early life 
Drusilla was most probably born in Caesaria (modern Cherchell, Algeria), the capital of the Roman client kingdom of Mauretania. She was named in honor of her father's second maternal cousin Julia Drusilla, one of the sisters of the Roman Emperor Caligula who died around the time of her birth.

First marriage 
Her father was executed while visiting Rome in 40. Mauretania was annexed by Rome and later became two Roman provinces. Drusilla was probably raised in the Imperial Family in Rome. Around 53, the Roman Emperor Claudius arranged for her to marry Marcus Antonius Felix, a Greek freedman who was the Roman Governor of Judea. Between the years 54 to 56, Felix divorced Drusilla as he fell in love with and married the Herodian princess Drusilla.

Drusilla held the Latin honorary title of Regina. The Roman historian Suetonius only uses the word Regina to describe a queen regnant or a queen consort. According to Suetonius, she is one of the three queens whom Felix married. Her title may have been purely honorary; possibly it reveals Felix's influence, the high position to which Claudius had appointed him, and his quasi-royal status in the imperial court. (As explained by Tacitus, Felix and his brother Marcus Antonius Pallas were descended from the Greek kings of Arcadia.) At the time of her first marriage, Drusilla was the only daughter of a king of a former kingdom, which may explain her title; the title may also reveal the identity of her second husband.

Second marriage
In 56 Drusilla married her distant relative the Emesene Priest King, Sohaemus, who ruled from 54 until his death in 73. Sohaemus was the Priest of the Syrian Sun God, known in Aramaic as El-Gebal. Through marriage, Drusilla became Queen consort of the Roman client kingdom of Emesa. Drusilla and Sohaemus had a son, Gaius Julius Alexion, also known as Alexio II, who later succeeded his father as Emesene Priest King. A possible descendant of Drusilla was the Syrian queen of the 3rd century, Zenobia of Palmyra. According to some speculation she may also have been an ancestor of Julius Bassianus, father of empress Julia Domna (wife of the Roman emperor Septimius Severus and mother of emperor Caracalla) as well as Julia Maesa (maternal grandmother of the emperors Elagabalus and Severus Alexander).

Ancestors

References

Further reading 
 Bennett, Chris (2003). "Drusilla Regina". The Classical Quarterly, 53(1), pp. 315–319. 

38 births
79 deaths
1st-century Roman women
Ancient Greek queens consort
Mauretania princesses
People from Cherchell
Ptolemaic dynasty
Emesene dynasty
1st-century African people